Daigenis Mercedes Saturria (born 2 August 1990) is a Dominican Republic badminton player. In 2013, she won the Carebaco International tournament in the women's doubles event partnered with Berónica Vibieca. In 2015, she also won the Carebaco International tournament in the women's and mixed doubles event and became the runner-up in the women's singles event. She competed at the 2015 Pan Am Games in Toronto, Canada.

Achievements

BWF International Challenge/Series 
Women's singles

Women's doubles

Mixed doubles

  BWF International Challenge tournament
  BWF International Series tournament
  BWF Future Series tournament

References

External links 
 

1990 births
Living people
Dominican Republic female badminton players
Badminton players at the 2015 Pan American Games
Pan American Games competitors for the Dominican Republic
Competitors at the 2014 Central American and Caribbean Games
21st-century Dominican Republic women